Allman (variants Alleman, Allmand) is an English surname from the Norman French aleman "German".
In North American usage, the spelling Allman likely also stands in for the cognate Spanish name Aleman
(to avoid the reading  /eɪlmæn/ as in "ale-man").

Notable people with the surname include:
Allman
Arthur Allman (1890–1956), English footballer
B. M. Allman, American football coach
Bob Allman (1914–1999), American football player
Brendt Allman (born 1970), American musician
Dan Allman (died 1921), IRA figure, killed during the Irish War of Independence
Devon Allman (born 1975), American musician
Dick Allman (1883–1943), English footballer
Duane Allman (1946–1971), American rock guitarist, co-founder of The Allman Brothers Band
Elijah Blue Allman (born 1976), son of Gregg Allman and Cher
Elizabeth S. Allman, American mathematician
Elvia Allman (1904–1992), American actress
Eric Allman (born 1955), American computer programmer
George Allman (disambiguation), multiple people
Gregg Allman (1947–2017), American rock singer and musician, co-founder of The Allman Brothers Band
Jamie Anne Allman, American actress
Jared Allman (born 1984), American actor
John Allman, American neuroscientist
John Allman (poet) (born 1935), American poet
Kyle Allman Jr. (born 1997), American basketball player
Leslie Allman (1902–1979), English footballer
Marshall Allman (born 1984), American actor
Quinn Allman (born 1982), American guitarist 
Richard Allman (1813–1904), Irish businessman from Bandon, also MP for Bandon 1880–85. 
Robert Allman (1927–2013), Australian operatic singer
Sheldon Allman (1924–2002), American-Canadian actor and singer
Steve Allman (born 1968), Norwegian ice hockey player
T. D. Allman (born 1944), American freelance journalist
Valarie Allman (born 1995), American track and field athlete
William Allman (1776–1846), Irish botanist
William G. Allman, American curator
Alleman
John George Alleman (1804–1865), American Catholic missionary
Andy Alleman (born 1983), American footballer

See also
Allemann (surname)
Aleman (surname)
Alleman, Iowa, city in the United States
Allemans, French commune

References

Ethnonymic surnames